Steffi Graf was the defending champion but did not compete that year.

Conchita Martínez won in the final 6–4, 6–0 against Natasha Zvereva.

Seeds
A champion seed is indicated in bold text while text in italics indicates the round in which that seed was eliminated. The top eight seeds received a bye to the second round.

  Arantxa Sánchez Vicario (quarterfinals)
  Conchita Martínez (champion)
  Martina Navratilova (second round)
  Gabriela Sabatini (second round)
  Lindsay Davenport (quarterfinals)
  Natasha Zvereva (final)
  Mary Pierce (semifinals)
  Zina Garrison-Jackson (second round)
  Amanda Coetzer (third round)
  Sabine Hack (third round)
  Lori McNeil (first round)
  Brenda Schultz (third round)
  Chanda Rubin (first round)
  Leila Meskhi (third round)
  Ginger Helgeson (quarterfinals)
  Barbara Rittner (third round)

Draw

Finals

Top half

Section 1

Section 2

Bottom half

Section 3

Section 4

References
 1994 Family Circle Cup draw

Charleston Open
1994 WTA Tour